NGC 4654 is an intermediate spiral galaxy in the constellation of Virgo at a distance of 55 million light years (16.8 megaparsecs) from the Milky Way that can be spotted with amateur telescopes.

Physical characteristics 
NGC 4654 is a member of the Virgo Cluster of galaxies that shows peculiarities in the distribution of both its atomic hydrogen and molecular hydrogen as well as an assimetry on the distribution of its stars, with the atomic hydrogen being compressed in the galaxy's northwestern part and forming a tail on its southeastern part. 
While interactions with Virgo's intracluster medium - that is stripping NGC 4654 of its gas as the galaxy moves through it - can explain its gas distribution, it is unable to explain the peculiarities in the distribution of its stars. It has been proposed that NGC 4654 interacted with its neighbor the spiral galaxy NGC 4639 about 500 million years ago; this, combined with weak ram-pressure stripping due to its motion within the Virgo cluster, may explain its features.
 
Despite suffering a loss of its neutral gas, NGC 4654 does not suffer the deficiency of it that is shown in many spiral galaxies of the Virgo cluster and also has the star formation typical for a galaxy of its type.

See also 
 Messier 88, another spiral galaxy of the Virgo cluster currently suffering ram-pressure stripping.
 NGC 4457

Gallery

References

External links
 

07902
Intermediate spiral galaxies
Virgo Cluster
4654
Virgo (constellation)
042857